Bra Boys is a 2007 Australian documentary film about a surf gang on Sydney's Maroubra Beach released in March 2007. The film details a story of the Bra Boys from the viewpoint of the gang members, particularly the Abbertons. Sunny Abberton wrote and co-directed the film with Macario De Souza. Actor Russell Crowe was producer and provided  narration. The film's official cast included 49 well known surfers from Bra Boys members Evan Faulks and Richie 'Vas' Vaculik to ten-time world champion Kelly Slater. Other participating prominent surfers include Mark Occhilupo, Bruce Irons, and Laird Hamilton.

Australian reviewer Margaret Pomeranz gave the movie an overall positive review, while her At the Movies co-host David Stratton criticised it as a "not a very well made film ... basically not much more than a home movie" and questioned how objective a documentary can be when it is directed by its subject.

The documentary became Australia's highest-grossing non-IMAX documentary film and won the Best Documentary at the 2008 Movie EXTRA Filmink Awards.  The movie saw a limited release in the United States that began on 11 April 2008, in 23 select locations in Southern California, New York and Hawaii. The film was distributed in Australia by Hopscotch Films and internationally by boutique distributor, Berkela Films. The film was released on DVD on 16 August 2007 with extras including the documentary, The Making of Bra Boys, extended surfing footage, coverage of the film's premiere, history of Australian surf culture, a fitness program presented by one of the Bra Boys, and music videos.

Cast
 Russell Crowe as Narrator 
 Kelly Slater
 Cheyne Horan
 Jack Kingsley
 Sean Doherty
 Koby Abberton
 Sunny Abberton
 Jai Abberton
 Wayne Cleveland
 Mark Mathews
 Wayne Bartholomew
 Nick Carroll
 Reni Maitua 
 John Sutton
 Mark Occhilupo
 Richie 'Vas' Vaculik
 Laird Hamilton
 Bruce Irons

See also
 Cinema of Australia

References

External links
 
 

Documentary films about surfing
2007 films
Films shot in Sydney
2007 documentary films
Australian surfing films
Documentary films about gangs
2000s English-language films
Australian sports documentary films
English-language documentary films